Novi Dvori of Zaprešić, or Novi Dvori of Jelačić, is a feudal estate in the northwestern part of Zaprešić, Croatia. The estate consists of a castle, an old granary renovated into a museum, a circular threshing machine, a neo-gothic chapel and the Jelačić family tomb.

History

Estate from 17th to 19th century 
During the process of disintegration of larger Susedgrad-Stubica seigniory, Novi dvori (Curia Nova), are mentioned as independent entity as early as the beginning of the 17th century. Historian Stjepan Laljak links estate's foundation with abandonment of nearby Susedgrad Castle, also owned by Zrinski, which was once a seat of the Susedgrad seignory but lost its purpose and became abandoned.  According to a document dated in 1852, the Novi Dvori manor was first constructed in 1611 as an ordinary one story manor house mostly made of wood. This initial 17th century concept of a manor, consisted of what is today a western part of the building and its shape has been preserved only in the cellar. Throughout the history, the owners of this estate were Zrinski family, Čikulin family, Sermage family, Festetics family and Erdödy family. Almost each of these owners gradually expanded the manor to the east. In second half of 18th century Peter Troilo Sermage turned the manor house into a castle and added several economic buildings such as barns, granaries and circular threshing machine to the estate. By the 19th century, castle became the property of Alexander Erdödy. The same family eventually sold the estate to ban Josip Jelačić in 1851.

Jelačić period 
Although law of Triune Kingdom of Croatia, formally obliged each candidate for position of Ban, to possess its own estate on Croatian soil, this criterion was briefly ignored upon Jelačić's appointment due to Revolutions of 1848. This was subsequently commented by Jelačić using following words:

"I have always lived for my Homeland and everything I did, I did out of loyalty and fidelity, not for those 400 000 forints that I spent for buying the land estate in sense of our Constitution, which asks for Croatian ban to also be the landowner in our Kingdom."

Written agreement on sale of the estate was made on March 23, 1852, despite Jelačić de facto buying the estate a year earlier.  The new owner had both estate and the castle reconstructed and annexed. He also further extended the castle 18 meters eastwards adding the east wing, while cellar, façade and the upper level were decorated. In 1855 construction of Neo-gothic chapel of St. Joseph started and it was finished after some two months of work. Following completion, the chapel was blessed on May 25, 1855. by an archbishop of Zagreb Juraj Haulik.

The same year, on Christmas, Josip Jelačić's wife - countess Sofia, gave birth to their daughter Anica on the estate, for which occasion, the banner was raised on top of the manor.  However, little Anica soon died as an infant so Jelačić had her body buried Inside St. Joseph chapel. He also planned to build the family tomb on the estate, but died in 1859, before being able to execute this. In his last will, he expressed a wish to be buried next to his daughter in the estate chapel. After the death of Josip Jelačić, the estate became the property of his brother Đuro, who continued managing it and finally completed tomb wished by Josip in 1884. The design for this was made by prominent Austrian architect Hermann Bollé. The construction of the tomb was made out of unused stone, taken from reconstruction of Zagreb cathedral, which was badly damaged in 1880 Zagreb earthquake. After Đuro's death, the castle was inherited by his daughters Anka and Vera. In 1919. countess Vera Jelačić donated the family collection of weapons and paintings from Novi dvori, to what was then Croatian People's Museum.  The daughters bequeathed the estate to the Croatian people in 1934. Although Đuro, Hermina, and much of the Jelačić family were initially buried in family arcade in Zagreb's Mirogoj cemetery, their remains were taken to the tomb in Novi Dvori in 1933, by the wish of countess Anka Jelačić. During the night on July 24, 1935, the tomb was looted by unknown vandals.

World War II and after 
After the Yugoslav defeat in the April War of 1941, and formation of Nazi puppet state Independent State of Croatia, the castle became a residence of Ante Pavelić. In that period a terrace was added to the southern side of the manor. After the end of war, the estate was turned into an Agricultural High School. The castle was renovated during the 1960s, while school continued to operate on this location until 1977., when it relocated to Zagreb leaving the estate empty. The tombs were looted again by vandals in 1987. who also, in this occasion desecrated the remains of Josip Jelačić, his brother Antun and his little daughter Anica.

Contemporary period 
In May 2017, it was announced that City of Zaprešić secured 40 million HRK from European Union funds in order to completely renovate the manor. After the restoration, the manor will be used as a residential space for ceremonial occasions and various exhibitions.

Gallery

See also 

 Susedgrad Castle

References

Zaprešić
Buildings and structures in Zagreb County
Tourist attractions in Zagreb County
Hermann Bollé buildings